This is a list of current and former Roman Catholic churches in the Roman Catholic Diocese of Sacramento. The diocese consists of 12 deaneries covering 20 counties in northwest California and includes the cities of Sacramento, Vallejo, Redding, Fairfield, and Chico

The mother church of the Diocese is the Cathedral of the Blessed Sacrament in Sacramento. The Diocese also includes several parishes dating from the time of the California Gold Rush in the 1850s: St. Canice in Nevada City; Immaculate Conception in Downieville; St. Patrick in Weaverville; St. Dominic in Benicia; and St. Joseph in Marysville.

City Deanery

American River Deanery

Gold Country Deanery

Mother Lode Deanery

Ridge Deanery

Shasta Deanery

Siskiyou Deanery

Solano Deanery

Southern Suburbs Deanery

Sutter Buttes Deanery

West Placer Deanery

Yolo Deanery

References

 
Sacramento